Willin Village Archeological Site is an archaeological site near Eldorado in Dorchester County, Maryland.  The Sussex Society of Archeology and History extensively excavated this site between 1951 and 1953. They identified grooved axes and stemmed points indicating use by Archaic peoples. It was possibly the site of a village during the Late Woodland period.

It was listed on the National Register of Historic Places in 1975.

References

External links
, including photo from 1974, at Maryland Historical Trust

Archaic period in North America
Archaeological sites in Dorchester County, Maryland
Archaeological sites on the National Register of Historic Places in Maryland
Native American history of Maryland
Woodland period
National Register of Historic Places in Dorchester County, Maryland